The 2019 Rio Grande Valley FC Toros season is the 4th season for Rio Grande Valley FC Toros in USL Championship, the second-tier professional soccer league in the United States and Canada.

Club
Current first team squad, as of February 15, 2019.

Competitions

Preseason

USL Championship

Standings

Match results
The 2019 USL Championship season schedule for the club was announced on December 19, 2018.

Unless otherwise noted, all times in CDT

U.S. Open Cup 

Due to their hybrid affiliation with the Dynamo, RGVFC was one of 13 teams expressly forbidden from entering the Cup competition.

References 

2019
Rio Grande
Rio Grande Valley FC
Rio Grande